The Colt Model 1903 Pocket Hammerless (not to be confused with the Colt Model 1903 Pocket Hammer or the M1903 Springfield rifle) is a .32 ACP caliber, self-loading, semi-automatic pistol designed by John Browning and built by Colt Patent Firearms Manufacturing Company of Hartford, Connecticut. The Colt Model 1908 Pocket Hammerless is a variant introduced five years later in .380 ACP caliber. Despite the title "hammerless", the Model 1903 does have a hammer. The hammer is covered and hidden from view under the rear of the slide, this allows the pistol to be carried in and withdrawn from a pocket quickly and smoothly without snagging.

History
Approximately 570,000 Colt Pocket Hammerless pistols were produced from 1903 to 1945, in five different types.  Some were issued to US Army and US Air Force general officers from World War II through the 1970s; these were replaced in 1972 with the RIA Colt M15 general officer's model, a compact version of the M1911A1.
The Shanghai Municipal Police issued the M1908 to its officers in the 1920s and 1930s and it was a popular model with police in the United States such as the Boston Police Department.
In addition to lawful owners, many gangsters of the pre-World War II era favored the Model 1903 and Model 1908 because they were relatively small and easily concealed. It is said that Al Capone kept one in his coat pocket and Bonnie Parker used one to break Clyde Barrow out of jail after smuggling it into the jail by taping it to her thigh. Bank robber John Dillinger was carrying this model of pistol when he was shot by FBI agents outside the Biograph theater on July 22, 1934, and another famous bank robber, Willie Sutton, had one when he was captured by police in Brooklyn on February 18, 1952.

This pistol was also used by an Indian revolutionary named Chandrashekhar Azad in 1931, when he committed suicide to avoid capture by the Indian Imperial Police in a park at the United Provinces of British India.

Note: There was also a Colt Model 1903 Pocket Hammer pistol in .38 ACP, but this design is unrelated. The FN Model 1903 pistol design is related to the Colt Pocket Hammerless, but it is physically larger due to its chambering in the 9×20mm SR Browning Long cartridge.

General officer models
General officer models were often engraved with the officer's name. Recipients include generals Eisenhower, Bradley, Marshall, and Patton. Patton's Model 1908 was embellished with three (later four) stars on the grip panels to denote his rank. They were issued with a fine-grade leather holster, leather pistol belt with gold-metal clasp, rope pistol lanyard with gold-metal fittings, and leather two-pocket ammunition pouch with gold-metal fasteners. They came in russet or black leather (depending on service and regulations) and were made by Atchison Leather Products or Hickok. A cleaning rod and two spare magazines were also included. Generals were issued the Model M in .380 ACP, until 1950, when supplies ran out. At that point, they were substituted with .32 models until their replacement in 1972. The Pocket Hammerless was replaced by the M15 pistol made by Rock Island Arsenal in .45 ACP. Today, the Pocket Hammerless is manufactured by U.S. Armament, and is licensed by Colt.

Design

This pistol is actually fired by action of a hammer striking and driving a firing pin into a center-fire cartridge's primer. The hammer is covered by the rear of the slide. The "hammerless" designation was merely an advertising designation pointing out the pistol's particular suitability for concealed carry. Special features include a serrated slide to prevent slippage during manual cycling of the slide and two safety mechanisms (a grip safety and a manual safety). The grip safety is a spring-loaded piece making up the back strap of the pistol. The grip safety, though not solely restricted to them, was a typical feature of Colt automatic pistols. A magazine safety was added on later models; this feature prevents the pistol from being fired with a round in the chamber and the magazine removed.

In 1908, a .380 ACP version of this gun was introduced. Called the Model 1908, it is nearly identical to the Model 1903 except for the bore diameter and the magazine, which holds seven rounds (one less than the Model 1903).

Grip panels are black checked hard rubber, checked walnut, or special order materials (ivory, mother of pearl, inset medallion).

Sights are fixed, although the rear sight is drift-adjustable for windage.

Metal finish is blued or nickel, and some special-order finishes such as engraved, silver- or gold-plated.

Variants
Type I:  .32 cal separate barrel bushing, four-inch barrel, no magazine safety, serial numbers 1 through 71,999
Type II: .32 cal separate barrel bushing, 3-inch barrel; 1908–1910, SN 72,000 through 105,050
Type II: .380 cal  separate barrel bushing, 3-inch barrel; 1908–1910, SN 001 through 6250 
Type III:  integrated barrel bushing, 3-inch barrel; 1910–1926, SN 105,051 through 468,789
Type IV:   integrated barrel bushing, 3-inch barrel, magazine safety
Type V:    integrated barrel bushing, 3-inch barrel, military sights, magazine safety on both commercial and "U.S. property" variations. SN 468,097 through 554,446.

There was an M1903 version with a military Parkerized finish, which is otherwise the same as the Model IV, SN 554,447 through 572,214.

Trivia
Former Japanese Prime Minister Hideki Tojo used a Colt Model 1903 to attempt suicide shortly before his arrest for war crimes on September 11, 1945.   Tojo was convicted at trial and was executed on December 23, 1948.  Tojo's pistol is on display at the MacArthur Memorial in Norfolk, Virginia.
The Colt Model 1903 Pocket Hammerless with SN539370 took part in the attempt of assassination SS-Obergruppenführer Reinhard Heydrich (top nazi officer) in Protectorate Bohemia and Moravia on May 27th 1942 in Prague. The assassination had been successful due to wounds he suffered from the bomb thrown into his car.

See also
List of individual weapons of the U.S. Armed Forces
Ruby pistol

References

External links

 
 
Colt pistol hammerless model 1903 (infographic tech. drawing)

Colt semi-automatic pistols
.32 ACP semi-automatic pistols
.380 ACP semi-automatic pistols
World War II firearms of the United States
Police weapons
Semi-automatic pistols 1901–1909
Simple blowback firearms
Firearms by John Browning
Weapons of the Philippine Army